Joe McMahon is an Irish Gaelic footballer who played for the Omagh St Enda's club and for the Tyrone county team.

His younger brother, Justin was the captain of the Tyrone under-21 team that won the 2006 Ulster Championship.

Playing career
Joe McMahon was part of the Omagh CBS MacRory Cup team that shared the title in 2001 (the scheduled replay was abandoned, due to restrictions of crowd gatherings amid a foot-and-mouth disease outbreak), and reached the final in 2002.

A two-time All-Ireland-winner, McMahon started the 2005 All-Ireland Senior Football Championship Final, but had to be replaced because of injury, making him the first Omagh man to win an All-Ireland. He also started the 2008 final at number 12 but played most of the game alongside his brother in the back line helping to hold Kerry's "Twin Towers" of Donaghy and Walsh to 1 point.

2008 was a career-defining year for McMahon, being switched between the forwards and the backs on the Tyrone side throughout most of the season. In the quarter final, while being one of a number of Tyrone players sporting a beard for the occasion, he scored a crucial goal against Dublin.

In October 2005, barely a month after his All-Ireland win, McMahon was part of the Omagh St Enda's team that reached the Tyrone Championship Final.

Post-playing
In 2018, McMahon joined the TTM Radio commentary team as match analyst.

References

External links
Interview in The Irish News ahead of the 2006 National League Campaign 

1983 births
Living people
Gaelic games writers and broadcasters
Irish international rules football players
Omagh St Enda's Gaelic footballers
People educated at Christian Brothers Grammar School, Omagh
Tyrone inter-county Gaelic footballers
Winners of two All-Ireland medals (Gaelic football)